The Alcron Hotel Prague is a historic hotel in Prague on Štěpánská, just off Wenceslas Square, the main plaza in the city center.

The Hotel Alcron was constructed by its owner/architect Alois Krofta, a local businessman, and opened in 1932. Krofta named the hotel after himself, taking the first two letters of his first and last names and adding an "n" to match the Alcron, a boat from Greek mythology. Pre-WWII guests included Charlie Chaplin and Winston Churchill, while Joachim von Ribbentrop and Karl Hermann Frank stayed at the hotel during the German occupation of Czechoslovakia. In 1948, the Alcron was nationalized by the new communist government.

Following the fall of communism, the hotel closed in 1990, and the Krofta family filed claims for restitution in 1992. A legal battle ensued between two of Krofta's ex-wives and one of their daughters. The three women were eventually each given 1/3 ownership, which they each sold in 1995 to an Austrian-based firm, Crown WSF Ltd. In 1996, the new owners contracted Radisson SAS Hotels to manage the establishment upon its reopening. It was completely rebuilt and modernized at great expense, with the historic public rooms restored to their original Art Deco grandeur. It reopened on 1 August 1998 as the Radisson SAS Hotel Prague. Crown secured the right to use the Alcron name two years later, and the hotel was renamed Radisson SAS Alcron Hotel. The hotel was again renovated in 2008 and renamed Radisson Blu Alcron Hotel in 2009, when the Radisson SAS partnership ended. After twenty years of management by Radisson, the Alcron Hotel became independent and was renamed Alcron Hotel Prague on 1 January 2019.

The Alcron hotel is home to the La Rotonde restaurant and the BeBop Bar.

References

External links
 

Hotel buildings completed in 1932
Hotels established in 1932
Hotels in Prague
1932 establishments in Czechoslovakia
20th-century architecture in the Czech Republic